Oklahoma State Cowboys baseball is the NCAA Division I varsity intercollegiate baseball team of Oklahoma State University, based in Stillwater, Oklahoma, United States. The team competes in the Big 12 Conference. The Cowboys' current head coach is Josh Holliday. 

Oklahoma State is a historically elite program, with the fifth-best win percentage, 14th-most wins, sixth-most College World Series wins, sixth-most College World Series appearances, and fourth-most NCAA Tournament appearances in college baseball history, as of June 14, 2021. The program has accumulated a better all-time win percentage and more wins, regular season conference championships, conference tournament championships, All-Americans, NCAA Tournament appearances, NCAA Tournament wins, College World Series appearances, College World Series Finals appearances, College World Series wins, and College Baseball Hall of Famers than any school in the Big 12 besides Texas. Oklahoma State has won 24 conference championships and 25 conference tournament championships as of the end of the 2021 season. The Cowboys have also earned 46 NCAA Tournament bids and have played in 20 College World Series, including a still-standing NCAA record seven straight CWS appearances from 1981 to 1987.

The Cowboys have four players/coaches in the College Baseball Hall of Fame: Gary Ward (who coached the program to 16 consecutive conference titles from 1980 to 1996), Tom Borland (1955 College World Series Most Outstanding Player), Pete Incaviglia (the all time home run king in college baseball history), and Robin Ventura (holder of an NCAA record 58-game hitting streak and widely regarded as the greatest hitter in college baseball history). 

Oklahoma State won the national championship in 1959, led by star pitcher Joel Horlen, who would later author the 12th no-hitter in Chicago White Sox history in 1967. Former OSU pitcher Allie Reynolds also threw two no-hitters with the New York Yankees in 1951, which is still tied as an MLB record for most no-hitters in a single season by one player. Former Cowboys Pitcher Daymon Thomas pitched a no hitter in his short 6 game season in 2002 , with his last game pitched striking out 11 batters only to be upset by a late 7th inning HR to stop from tiring the record set by Allie Reynolds.Former Cowboy pitcher John Farrell managed the Boston Red Sox to two World Series championships in 2007 and 2013.

History

1959 national championship
The 1959 Cowboys baseball team entered the season not expected to do much. Only four players, left fielder Don Soergel, and pitchers Roy Peterson, Joel Horlen, and Dick Soergel, were on the roster from the previous season. The preseason prospectus for 1959 read, "The baseball outlook for coach Toby Greene's 16th edition of Cowboy baseball is quite questionable. Despite the return of key members from last year's pitching staff, it's hard to consider the Pokes much of a threat with graduation, grades and the pros robbing the veteran OSU mentor of all but one of his starters." The team compiled a 17–3 conference record, winning the Big Eight conference title.

OSU opened the 1959 national tournament with a 10–2 victory over Western Michigan behind a Joel Horlen five-hitter. They had to rally for three runs in the seventh in its next game against Penn State and won 8–6 with eleven team hits. In their next game, the Cowboys lost to Arizona by a score of 5–3, as Soergel lost his first career game in twelve decisions. In the losers bracket, the Pokes found themselves down 3–2 in the ninth, but scraped across two runs to earn the 4–3 victory. A Fresno State victory over Arizona that night left three teams with one loss each. Arizona won the coin toss and became the odd man out as Oklahoma State and Fresno State met for the chance to play the Wildcats for the national championship. The Cowboys beat the Bulldogs 4–0 to advance to the championship game.

In the championship game, Jim Dobson, who was voted the Most Valuable Player, opened the O-State scoring with a towering home run over the left-field fence in the fourth inning. Arizona picked up single runs in the fourth and fifth and led 2–1. Bancroft tied the score with a solo home run in the top of the sixth, but the Wildcats added a run of their own in the bottom of the sixth to lead 3–2. It was another sophomore, Bruce Andrew, who sparked the game-winning three-run rally in the top of the seventh, and OSU led 5–3. Soergel shut out the Wildcats in the final three innings and OSU had its first NCAA Baseball Championship.

Four Cowboy players were named to the College World Series All-Tournament team, including third baseman and MVP Dobson. Also selected were Bruce Andrew at second base, Connie McIlvoy in the outfield and Horlen at pitcher.

Head coaches

Conference affiliations
Independent (1901–1914, 1956–1960)
Southwest Conference (1914–1924)
MVIAA (1924–1927)
Missouri Valley Conference (1927–1956)
Big Eight Conference (1960–1996)
Big 12 Conference (1996–present)

Facilities

The Cowboys planned to open the new O'Brate Stadium, located one block northwest of the team's current home of Allie P. Reynolds Stadium, on March 20, 2020 for the Cowboys' Big 12 opener against TCU. The Cowboys played their first 11 of a planned 14 home games of the 2020 season at Reynolds Stadium. Named for major donor Cecil O'Brate, the new ballpark has a permanent capacity of 3,500 but is expandable to 8,000.

Reynolds Stadium is named after the former OSU player Allie Reynolds, who went on to play professionally for the Cleveland Indians and New York Yankees. The park, with a capacity of 3,821, opened in 1981 at a cost of $2.2 million.

Year-by-year results

Rivalries

Oklahoma Sooners

Oklahoma State's series against Bedlam rival Oklahoma has featured more games played than any other OSU baseball series. As of the end of the 2021 season, the Cowboys lead the overall series with the Sooners 179–155 and hold a 56–40 lead in games played since the inception of the Big 12. Oklahoma State has dominated the rivalry in recent years, winning 23 of 30 contests since 2013, head coach Josh Holliday's first season.

Former Cowboy Major Leaguers

Player awards
The following Cowboys were given the following awards, as voted on by the American Baseball Coaches Association, Baseball America, Collegiate Baseball, the National Collegiate Baseball Writers Association, and Sporting News:

National awards

 Dick Howser Trophy
Robin Ventura, 1988
 Golden Spikes Award
Robin Ventura, 1988
 Sporting News College Baseball Player of the Year
Robbie Wine, 1982
Robin Ventura, 1987, 1988
 College World Series Most Outstanding Player
Tom Borland, 1955
Jim Dobson, 1959
Littleton Fowler, 1961

First-Team All-Americans

 1951
Joe Buck (C), (ABCA)
 1955
Ron Bennett (OF) (ABCA)
Tom Borland (P) (ABCA)
 1960
Dick Soergel (P) (ABCA)
 1961
Jim Wixson (P) (ABCA)
 1967
Tony Sellari (C) (ABCA)
 1968
Danny Thompson (SS) (ABCA)
 1982
Robbie Wine (C) (ABCA)
 1983
Dennis Livingston (P) (BA)
 1984
Pete Incaviglia (DH) (ABCA, BA)
 1985
Pete Incaviglia (OF) (ABCA, BA)
 1986
Robin Ventura (3B) (BA)
 1987
Robin Ventura (3B) (ABCA, BA)
Jim Ifland (DH) (ABCA)

 1988
Robin Ventura (3B) (BA)
Monty Fariss (SS) (BA)
 1991
Michael Daniel (DH) (BA, CB)
 1993
Ernesto Rivera (3B) (NCBWA)
 1994
Jason Bell (P) (BA, NCBWA) 
 1995
Tal Light (3B) (NCBWA)
Peter Prodanov (SS) (NCBWA)
 1996
Jeff Guiel (OF) (ABCA, CB)
 1997
Jeff Guiel (OF) (ABCA, CB)
 2012
Andrew Heaney (P) (ABCA, BA, NCBWA)
 2014
Brendan McCurry (P) (NCBWA)
 2015
Michael Freeman (P) (ABCA, BA, NCBWA)
 2016
Thomas Hatch (D1 Baseball)
 2017
Garrett McCain (OF) (ABCA)

All College World Series

1955
Tom Borland (P)
1959
Bruce Andrew (2B)
Jim Dobson (3B)
Connie McIlvoy (OF)
Joel Horlen (P)
1961
Bruce Andrew (2B)
Don Wallace (3B)
Littleton Fowler (P)
1966
Bob Toney (3B)
Wayne Weatherly (OF)
1968
Danny Thompson (SS)
Wayne Weatherly (OF)
1981
Ray Echtebarren (2B)
Mickey Tettleton (OF)

1983
Tim Knapp (OF)
Pete Incaviglia (OF)
1984
Randy Whisler (2B)
Gary Green (SS)
Pete Incaviglia (DH)
1986
Robin Ventura (3B)
1987
Adam Smith (C)
Jimmy Barragan (1B)
Brad Beanblossom (2B)
Pat Hope (P)
1990
Michael Daniel (C)
Brad Beanblossom (SS)
Bobby Carlsen (3B)
1993
Hunter Triplett (1B)
Jason Heath (OF)

Hall of Fame
The Oklahoma State Cowboy baseball program has produced four National College Baseball Hall of Famers, who were inducted in the first three years of its existence. Oklahoma State baseball has its own Hall of Fame, in which  players and coaches have been inducted.

National College Baseball Hall of Famers
Robin Ventura, 2006
Pete Incaviglia, 2007
Gary Ward, 2008
Tom Borland, 2013

Cowboy Baseball Hall of Famers

Class of 1992
Joe Buck, C, 1950–51
Pete Incaviglia, OF, 1983–85
Allie P. Reynolds, RHP, 1936–38
Mickey Tettleton, OF/C, 1979–81
Jim Traber, 1B, 1980–82
Class of 1993
Darren Dilks, LHP/DH, 1979–81
Danny Doyle, C, 1938–40
Mike Henneman, RHP, 1983–84
Joel Horlen, RHP, 1958–59
Robbie Wine, C, 1981–83
Class of 1994
Larry Burchart, RHP, 1966–67
Michael Daniel, C, 1990–91
Monty Fariss, SS, 1986–88
John Farrell, RHP, 1981–84
Dick Soergel, RHP, 1958–60
Class of 1996
Jeff Bronkey, RHP, 1984–86
Jeromy Burnitz, OF, 1988–90
Littleton Fowler, LHP, 1961–63
Bill Platt, Radio Announcer, 1958–95
Jim Wixson, RHP, 1960–62
Class of 1997
Bruce Andrew, IF, 1959–61
Mike Day, C, 1982–85
Tim Pugh, RHP, 1986–89

Class of 1998
Tom Borland, LHP, 1953–55
Bill Dobbs, LHP, 1967–69
Jim Ifland, 1B/DH, 1986–87
Robin Ventura, 3B, 1986–88
Class of 1999
Jimmy Barragan, 1B, 1985–87
Gary Green, SS, 1981–84
Wayne Weatherly, OF, 1966–68
Class of 2000
Jim Dobson, 3B/OF, 1959–61
Dennis Livingston, LHP, 1982–84
Mitchel Simons, 2B/OF, 1988–90
Class of 2001
Jerry Adair, IF, 1957–58
Jason Bell, RHP, 1993–95
Dan Massari, 1B, 1972–75
Class of 2002
Doug Dascenzo, OF, 1984–85
Tony Sellari, C, 1965–67
Class of 2003
Brad Beanblossom, IF, 1987–90
Josh Holliday, C/INF, 1996–99
Frank Kellert, P/1B, 1947–49

Class of 2004
Gary Ward, Coach, 1978–96
Class of 2014
Josh Fields, 3B, 2002-04
Billy Gasparino, SS, 1997-99
Danny Thompson, SS, 1967-68
Class of 2015
Jeff Guiel, OF, 1996-97
Rusty McNamara, OF, 1995-97
Class of 2016
Corey Brown, OF, 2005-07
Tom Holliday, Coach, 1978-2003
Class of 2017
Toby Greene, Coach, 1943-64
Jordy Mercer, SS/RHP, 2006-08
Ty Wright, OF, 2004-07
Class of 2018
Tyler Mach, IF, 2006-07
Rob Walton, RHP 1983-86, Coach 2013-pres.
Class of 2019
Andrew Heaney, LHP, 2010-12
Peter Prodanov, INF/OF, 1992-95
Matt Smith, LHP, 1998-2000

See also
List of NCAA Division I baseball programs

References

External links